Two vessels with the name Ann and Amelia have served the East India Company (EIC).

  was launched at Whitby in 1781. She carried cargo to India for the EIC in 1782 and returned in 1803 with another cargo for the company. The Royal Navy purchased her in 1804 and converted her to a 44-gun fifth rate. She became a storeship in 1808 and was expended in April 1809 as a fireship at the battle of the Basque Roads.
  was launched in 1816 at Chittagong. She transported convicts from Britain to Port Jackson, New South Wales, in 1822. She was sold at Calcutta in August 1823 for a "Free Trader". She then made three voyages for the EIC and was lost in a gale on the coast of France in 1835 as she was finishing her third voyage.

Ships of the British East India Company
Merchant ships of the United Kingdom
Ship names